A Guy Named Joe is a 1943 American romantic fantasy drama film directed by Victor Fleming. The film was produced by Everett Riskin, and starred Spencer Tracy, Irene Dunne, and Van Johnson. The screenplay, written by Dalton Trumbo and Frederick Hazlitt Brennan, was adapted from a story by Chandler Sprague and David Boehm, for which they were nominated for an Academy Award for Best Writing, Original Story.

The film is notable for being Van Johnson's first major role. It also features the popular song "I'll Get By (As Long as I Have You)" by Fred Ahlert and Roy Turk, performed in the film by Irene Dunne.

Steven Spielberg's 1989 film Always is a remake of A Guy Named Joe, and stars Richard Dreyfuss, Holly Hunter, and John Goodman. Always updates the story for a 1989 setting, exchanging the World War II backdrop to one of aerial firefighting.

Plot
Pete Sandidge is the reckless pilot of a North American B-25 Mitchell bomber flying out of England during World War II. He is in love with Air Transport Auxiliary pilot Dorinda Durston, an American civilian pilot ferrying aircraft all over the United Kingdom. Pete's commanding officer, "Nails" Kilpatrick, first transfers Pete and his crew to a base in Scotland, then offers him a transfer back to the United States to be a flight instructor. Dorinda begs him to accept; Pete agrees, but goes out on one last mission with his best friend Al Yackey to check out a German aircraft carrier. Wounded after an attack by an enemy fighter, Pete has his crew bail out before going on to bomb the carrier and then crash into the sea.

Pete then finds himself walking in clouds, where he first recognizes an old friend, Dick Rumney. Pete suddenly becomes uneasy, remembering that Dick went down with his aircraft in a fiery crash. As Pete processes where he is, Dick ushers him to a meeting with "The General", who gives him an assignment. He is to be sent back to Earth, where a year has elapsed, to pass on his experience and knowledge to Ted Randall at flight school, then in the South Pacific, where Ted is a Lockheed P-38 Lightning fighter pilot. Ted's commanding officer turns out to be Al Yackey.

The situation becomes complicated when Ted meets the still-grieving Dorinda, now a ferry pilot with the Womens Airforce Service Pilots in New Guinea. Al encourages Dorinda to give the young pilot a chance. Dorinda and Ted gradually fall in love; Ted proposes to her and she accepts, much to Pete's jealous dismay.

When Dorinda finds out from Al that Ted has been given an extremely dangerous assignment to destroy the largest Japanese ammunition dump in the Pacific, she steals his aircraft. Pete guides her in completing the mission and returning to the base to Ted's embrace. Pete accepts what must be and walks away, his job done.

Cast
 Spencer Tracy as Pete Sandidge
 Irene Dunne as Dorinda Durston
 Van Johnson as Ted Randall
 Ward Bond as Al Yackey
 James Gleason as "Nails" Kilpatrick
 Lionel Barrymore as The General
 Barry Nelson as Dick Rumney
 Esther Williams as Ellen Bright, a USO hostess
 Henry O'Neill as Colonel Sykes
 Don DeFore as James J. Rourke (as Don De Fore)
 Charles Smith as Sanderson
 Addison Richards as Major Corbett
 Kirk Alyn as Officer in Heaven (uncredited) 
 Maurice Murphy as Capt. Robertson (uncredited)

Production
A Guy Named Joe introduced Van Johnson in his first major role. When the filming was partially completed in 1943, Johnson was in a serious automobile accident. The crash lacerated his forehead and damaged his skull so severely doctors inserted a plate in his head. MGM wanted to replace Johnson, but Tracy convinced the studio to suspend filming until Johnson could return to work, which he did after four months of recovery. He then went on to become a major star. Because the movie was filmed before and after the accident, Johnson can be seen without and with the forehead scars he bore from then on.

During Johnson's period of recovery, Spencer Tracy recorded broadcasts for Armed Forces Radio and visited hospitals along the California coast, shaking hands, signing autographs, posing for pictures, and occasionally appearing at the Hollywood Canteen, where he would sing "Pistol Packin' Mama" to the soldiers. Irene Dunne was required to begin work on another already scheduled MGM picture called The White Cliffs of Dover, resulting in her having to perform in both pictures simultaneously after Johnson returned. She later described the difficulties this entailed: "I’ve always lived the characters I played, and to be these two entirely different women at the same time was unbearable.”

One of the other reasons Johnson was allowed to stay was because a deal was made that Tracy and director Victor Fleming had to stop making Dunne's life miserable on set. Although she had been excited to work with Tracy, the actor took an instant dislike to her and endlessly teased her, sometimes driving her to tears. The deal was made, and Dunne and Tracy took the extra time caused by Johnson's recovery to re-shoot some of the scenes where their hostility was noticeable.

Budget restrictions precluded location shooting, and all the flying scenes were staged at the MGM Studios. For an air of authenticity, footage shot at various United States Army Air Forces (USAAF) bases throughout the United States was incorporated via an exterior backdrop process. Authentic aircraft were used, although they remained firmly on the ground. The pivotal scene with Irene Dunne flying a Lockheed P-38 Lightning was recreated at Drew Field, Florida, utilizing a surplus P-38E which had been acquired from the USAAF, where it had been used as an instructional aircraft. Electric motors drove the propellers and allowed for an authentic run-up sequence. The miniature work was the product of the same MGM special effects team of A. Arnold Gillespie, Donald Jahrus and Warren Newcombe that would later be responsible for Thirty Seconds Over Tokyo (1944).

During the scene where Tracy's character dies, he was shown making a suicidal divebomb run on a German aircraft carrier, despite the fact that Germany never had an operational aircraft carrier in service before or during World War II.

After completion of the picture, the Production Code Administration (PCA) objected to its ending, which originally depicted Irene Dunne’s character crashing after bombing an enemy ammunition dump, thereby reuniting her with Tracy’s Pete Sandidge at the fade-out. The PCA held that this represented a wilful act of suicide, which, under the Code, could never be “justified, or glorified, or used specifically to defeat the ends of justice.” Dunne was flown in from Mexico City to film a revised ending.

Aircraft used in the film
 Lockheed P-38E Lightning fighter ("static", propellers turned by electric motors)
 North American B-25 Mitchell bomber (special effects scale model)
 Vultee BT-13 Valiant trainer (static but flyable aircraft on loan from Luke Field Arizona)
 North American P-51A Mustangs as Luftwaffe fighters
 Martin B-26 Marauders as Japanese bombers
 North American Yale trainers (NA 64) at an unnamed BCTAP field in Canada.
 C-36 or C-40 in some scenes, C-47 and C-60 in others

Reception
A Guy Named Joe premiered at the Capitol Theater in New York on December 23, 1943 to generally positive reviews. Life Magazine summed up the critical reaction: "MGM's A Guy Named Joe manages to remain strong and exciting despite such weaknesses as verbosity and a climax that is pure Perils of Pauline." Bosley Crowther of The New York Times considered it "a tricky excursion into metaphysical realms." that almost comes off.

The film was eventually released nationally in the United States on March 10, 1944 and became one of the top-grossing movies of that year.

The team of David Boehm and Chandler Sprague were nominated for the  Best Story Academy Award in 1944, which was eventually received by Leo McCarey for Going My Way at the 17th Academy Awards.

The film is recognized by American Film Institute in these lists:
 2002: AFI's 100 Years...100 Passions – Nominated
 2006: AFI's 100 Years...100 Cheers – Nominated

Box office
According to MGM records, the film earned $3,970,000 in the US and Canada, and $1,393,000 overseas, resulting in a profit of $1,066,000.

See also
List of films about angels
Always (1989 film)

References
Notes

Citations

Bibliography

 Breyer, Siegfried. The German Aircraft Carrier Graf Zeppelin. Atglen, Pennsylvania: Schiffer Publishing Ltd., 1989. .
 Dolan Edward F. Jr. Hollywood Goes to War. London: Bison Books, 1985. .
 Hardwick, Jack and Ed Schnepf. "A Viewer's Guide to Aviation Movies." The Making of the Great Aviation Films. General Aviation Series, Volume 2, 1989.
 Orriss, Bruce. When Hollywood Ruled the Skies: The Aviation Film Classics of World War II. Hawthorn, California: Aero Associates Inc., 1984. .

External links

 
 
 
 

1943 films
1940s English-language films
1940s fantasy films
American black-and-white films
American fantasy films
American romantic fantasy films
Fantasy war films
Films about angels
Films about death
Films about the United States Army Air Forces
Films directed by Victor Fleming
Films scored by Herbert Stothart
Films shot in South Carolina
Films with screenplays by Dalton Trumbo
Metro-Goldwyn-Mayer films
World War II aviation films
World War II films made in wartime